At Play (also known as Deadmau5 at Play and At Play Vol. 1) is a compilation album by Canadian electronic music producer Deadmau5. It is the first installment of Play Records' At Play series. It was released on October 20, 2008.

The album consists of several deadmau5 tracks from his earlier releases (such as Vexillology), tracks from later releases (such as Random Album Title), as well as collaborations with Melleefresh. The tracks are suitable for DJs to play and mix.

Background 

In 2008, Play Records (Zimmerman's label at that time) parted ways with deadmau5 and the company gained ownership of the catalogue of tracks deadmau5 produced during his time with them as part of the agreement. At Play was Play's first release after Zimmerman's departure from the label.

In 2009, Play Records reissued At Play. All of the tracks remained the same, but the album was renamed to At Play, Vol. 1, and the Play Records logo on the cover was replaced with a yellow "mau5head".

Track listing

Charts

Release history

References

External links 
 At Play at Discogs

2008 albums
Deadmau5 albums